The Blanding Formation is a geologic formation in Iowa. It preserves fossils dating back to the Silurian period.

See also

 List of fossiliferous stratigraphic units in Iowa
 Paleontology in Iowa

References

 

Silurian Iowa
Silurian southern paleotropical deposits